TILS may refer to:
 Tumor-infiltrating lymphocytes
 TRNAIle-lysidine synthase, an enzyme